Cerothallia yorkensis is a species of crustose lichen in the family Teloschistaceae. Found in Australia, where it grows on limestone outcrops, it was described as new to science in 2011. The specific epithet yorkensis refers to the type locality, Yorke Peninsula. It was originally described as a member of the genus Caloplaca, but transferred to Cerothallia in 2013.

References

Teloschistales
Lichen species
Lichens described in 2011
Lichens of Australia
Taxa named by Ingvar Kärnefelt
Taxa named by Sergey Kondratyuk